Nicollet County is a county in the U.S. state of Minnesota. As of the 2020 census, the population was 34,454. Its county seat is St. Peter.

Nicollet County is part of the Mankato–North Mankato, MN Metropolitan Statistical Area.

History
In 1849 the Minnesota Territory legislature defined the boundaries of nine future counties. One of those, Dakota, contained the area north of the Minnesota River where it altered its flow from southeast to northeast. In 1853 the first settler had homesteaded  an area on the northeast run of the river, and the following year the settlement of Saint Peter was platted there. Seeing the inflow of settlers into the areas adjoining the river, on March 5, 1853, the territorial legislature partitioned off the lower portion of Dakota County to form a separate entity. It was named for Joseph Nicolas Nicollet (1786-1843), a French explorer whose maps of the area had been instrumental in the territory's development. The county seat was established at Saint Peter.

Geography
The Minnesota River flows eastward along the southern border of Nicollet County, from its northwestern corner to its northeastern corner, defining the county's southern line. The county terrain consists of low rolling hills, completely devoted to agriculture where possible. The terrain slopes to the east.

Nicollet County's highest point is the lowest high point of all Minnesota counties, with an elevation of 1,065 feet. The county's high point is east of Clear Lake and west of the town of Lafayette.

Major highways

  US Highway 14
  US Highway 169
  Minnesota State Highway 4
  Minnesota State Highway 15
  Minnesota State Highway 22
  Minnesota State Highway 60
  Minnesota State Highway 99
  Minnesota State Highway 111
 List of county roads

Adjacent counties

 Sibley County - north
 Le Sueur County - east
 Blue Earth County - (southeast)
 Brown County - southwest
 Renville County - northwest

Protected areas
 Fort Ridgely State Park (part)
 Minneopa State Park (part)
 Seven Mile Creek County Park

Lakes

 Annexstad Lake
 Erickson Lake
 Middle Lake
 Oak Leaf Lake
 Overson Lake
 Rice Lake
 Sand Lake
 Swan Lake

Demographics

2000 census

As of the 2000 census, there were 29,771 people, 10,642 households, and 7,311 families in the county. The population density was 66.5/sqmi (25.7/km2). There were 11,240 housing units at an average density of 25.1/sqmi (9.69/km2). The racial makeup of the county was 96.37% White, 0.80% Black or African American, 0.26% Native American, 1.14% Asian, 0.02% Pacific Islander, 0.65% from other races, and 0.75% from two or more races. 1.80% of the population were Hispanic or Latino of any race. 49.2% were of German, 13.3% Norwegian, 6.8% Swedish and 5.4% Irish ancestry.

There were 10,642 households, out of which 35.30% had children under the age of 18 living with them, 57.50% were married couples living together, 7.90% had a female householder with no husband present, and 31.30% were non-families. 24.00% of all households were made up of individuals, and 8.80% had someone living alone who was 65 years of age or older. The average household size was 2.56 and the average family size was 3.05.

The county population contained 24.70% under the age of 18, 16.40% from 18 to 24, 26.90% from 25 to 44, 21.20% from 45 to 64, and 10.80% who were 65 years of age or older. The median age was 33 years. For every 100 females, there were 99.30 males. For every 100 females age 18 and over, there were 96.90 males.

The median income for a household in the county was $46,170, and the median income for a family was $55,694. Males had a median income of $36,236 versus $25,344 for females. The per capita income for the county was $20,517. About 4.30% of families and 7.50% of the population were below the poverty line, including 6.70% of those under age 18 and 8.00% of those age 65 or over.

2020 Census

Communities

Cities

 Courtland
 Lafayette
 Mankato (partly in Blue Earth County)
 Nicollet
 North Mankato (partly in Blue Earth County)
 St. Peter (county seat)

Unincorporated communities

 Bernadotte
 Klossner
 New Sweden
 Norseland
 North Star
 Oshawa
 St. George
 Traverse

Ghost town
 West Newton

Townships

 Belgrade Township
 Bernadotte Township
 Brighton Township
 Courtland Township
 Granby Township
 Lafayette Township
 Lake Prairie Township
 New Sweden Township
 Nicollet Township
 Oshawa Township
 Ridgely Township
 Traverse Township
 West Newton Township

Government and politics
Nicollet County has been politically balanced in past decades. Since 1976 the county has selected the Democratic and Republican Party candidates in equal measure in national elections (as of 2020).

See also
 National Register of Historic Places listings in Nicollet County, Minnesota

References

External links
 Nicollet County official website

 
Minnesota counties
Mankato – North Mankato metropolitan area
1853 establishments in Minnesota Territory
Populated places established in 1853